Bena is a village in northwestern Nigeria. Bena has a tropical savanna Köppen climate classification and an area of 3.92 square kilometers, which includes a large market, a medical center, a bakery and a supermarket.

References 

Populated places in Kebbi State